The 71st Infantry Division was a unit of the United States Army in World War II.

World War II
Activated: 15 July 1943 at Camp Carson, Colorado
Overseas: 26 January 1945.
Campaigns: Rhineland, Central-Europe
Days of combat: 62.
Awards: DSC-7 ; DSM-1 ; SS-180; LM-1 ; SM-8 ; BSM-695 ; AM-10.
Commanders: Brig. Gen. Robert L. Spragins (July 1943 – October 1944), Maj. Gen. Eugene M. Landrum (October–November 1944), Maj. Gen. Willard G. Wyman (November 1944-16 August 1945), Brig. Gen. Onslow S. Rolfe (17 August 1945 – 10 October 1945), Maj. Gen. A. Arnim White (October 1945 – February 1946), Col. William Westmoreland (February–June 1946).
Returned to U.S.: 10 March 1946.
Inactivated: 12 March 1946 at Camp Kilmer, New Jersey

Order of battle

 Headquarters, 71st Infantry Division
 5th Infantry Regiment
 14th Infantry Regiment
 66th Infantry Regiment
 Headquarters and Headquarters Battery, 71st Infantry Division Artillery
 564th Field Artillery Battalion (155 mm)
 607th Field Artillery Battalion (105 mm)
 608th Field Artillery Battalion (105 mm)
 609th Field Artillery Battalion (105 mm)
 271st Engineer Combat Battalion
 371st Medical Battalion
 71st Cavalry Reconnaissance Troop (Mechanized)
 Headquarters, Special Troops, 71st Infantry Division
 Headquarters Company, 71st Infantry Division
 771st Ordnance Light Maintenance Company
 251st Quartermaster Company
 571st Signal Company
 Military Police Platoon
 Band
 71st Counterintelligence Corps Detachment

Early history

The division was first organized as the 71st Light Division (Pack, Jungle), intended for use in the mountainous jungle areas of the Pacific theater. Smaller than the standard 14,000-man infantry division, at about 9,000 personnel, its primary means of transport was hundreds of horses and mules controlled by several quartermaster pack companies of muleteers, and for artillery several battalions of  75mm pack howitzers, instead of the standard  M2A1 105 mm howitzer, which could be broken down into several loads and carried by mule train. 

The 5th and 14th Infantry Regiments, Regular Army units which had been stationed in the Panama Canal Zone for several years prior to the war and had received extensive training in jungle operations during that time, were assigned to the division to provide the nucleus of jungle expertise. The 66th Infantry Regiment was constituted in the Regular Army on 10 July 1943, and activated and assigned to the division on 15 July 1943 as its third regiment.

After training at Camp Carson, Colorado, the division was sent to Hunter Ligget Military Reservation in the mountains inland from Big Sur, California, where it maneuvered against the 89th Light Division as a test of the light division concept. As a result of the test, it was decided that the light divisions had insufficient manpower and firepower to be effective, and the concept was abandoned. The 71st Division was sent to Fort Benning, Georgia, where it was reorganized and retrained as a standard infantry division, although it remained unusual in having Regular Army infantry regiments assigned to a division raised in the Army of the United States.

Combat chronicle
 
The 71st Infantry Division arrived at Le Havre, France, 6 February 1945, and trained at Camp Old Gold with headquarters at Limesy. The division moved east, relieved the 100th Infantry Division at Ratswiller and saw its first action on 11 March 1945. Their ouster of the Germans from France began 15 March. The division moved through outer belts of the Siegfried Line, captured Pirmasens, 21 March, and crossed the Rhine at Oppenheim, 30 March. The 71st continued the advance, taking Coburg without resistance, cutting the Munich-Berlin autobahn, 13 April, and capturing Bayreuth after fierce opposition on 16 April. Moving south, the Division destroyed Schönfeld, 18 April, took Rosenberg, crossed the Naab River at Kallmünz on 24 April and crossed the Danube on 26 April. Regensburg fell on the next day and Straubing on 28 April. As resistance crumbled, the division crossed the Isar on 29 April and entered Austria, 2 May.

Participated in the liberation of concentration camps including one in Austria called Gunskirchen Lager, a subcamp of Mauthausen, on 4 May. A pamphlet was produced by the US Army after they liberated the camp, called "The Seventy-First came to Gunskirchen Lager." The book recounts in detail, and with graphic photos, the tragedy they found in the camp. The complete booklet is available for free on-line.

The 71st organized and occupied defensive positions along the Enns River and contacted Russian forces east of Linz, 8 May, the day before hostilities ceased, having gone further east than any other U.S. Army unit. The division was assigned occupational duties until it left for home and inactivation 1 March 1946.

During the last several weeks of the war, the 761st Tank Battalion, an African-American unit, was attached to the 71st Division and fought with it. The 71st Division is also the formation in which Lt. John D. Eisenhower, General Dwight Eisenhower's son, served.

In January 1946, Colonel William Westmoreland was appointed commander, and was responsible for leading the units that had not yet been deactivated back to the United States so they could be demobilized.

Casualties
Total battle casualties: 1,114
Killed in action: 243
Wounded in action: 843
Missing in action: 9
Prisoner of war: 19

Assignments in ETO
21 January 1945: Fifteenth Army, 12th Army Group.
2 March 1945: Seventh Army, 6th Army Group.
9 March 1945: XV Corps.
22 March 1945: XXI Corps.
25 March 1945: VI Corps.
29 March 1945: 12th Army Group.
8 April 1945: Third Army, 12th Army Group.
11 April 1945: XII Corps.
20 April 1945: XX Corps.

Alaska
In 1954 the 71st Infantry Division was reactivated in the northwest United States and Alaska as the division headquarters for several geographically separated units, to include the 53d Infantry Regiment headquartered at Fort Richardson, Alaska, with additional units stationed at Fort Greely, and the 4th and 5th Infantry regiments at Fort Lewis, Washington. The 723rd Tank Battalion was also withdrawn from the Army Reserve and activated at Camp Irwin and assigned to the 71st. In this status the division was known as a "static division" not capable of or intended for deployment. (A second "static" unit, the 23d Infantry Division, was activated in the Caribbean region.)

Units of the reactivated 71st Infantry Division included the following:
 Headquarters
 Headquarters Company
 Medical Detachment, Division HQ
 71st Infantry Division Band
 71st Military Police Company
 771st Ordnance Battalion
 71st Quartermaster Company
 71st Replacement Company
 71st Signal Company
 71st Reconnaissance Company
 723d Tank Battalion (120mm Gun)
 371st Medical Battalion
 271st Engineer Battalion (Combat)
 4th Infantry Regiment
 5th Infantry Regiment
 53d Infantry Regiment
 Headquarters and Headquarters Battery, 71st Division Artillery
 Medical Detachment, 71st Division Artillery
 555th Field Artillery Battalion (105mm Howitzer, Towed)
 564th Field Artillery Battalion (155mm Howitzer, Towed)
 167th Antiaircraft Artillery Battalion (AW)(SP)
 274th Armored Field Artillery Battalion (105mm Howitzer, SP)
 607th Armored Field Artillery Battalion (105mm Howitzer, SP)

The division lasted in this status for less than two years, being inactivated at Fort Lewis on 15 September 1956.

General
Nickname: The Red Circle.
Shoulder patch: A red circle with a white center bearing the Arabic numerals "71" in blue and placed diagonally.

References

The Army Almanac: A Book of Facts Concerning the Army of the United States U.S. Government Printing Office, 1950. Online at the United States Army Center of Military History.
The Seventy-First came to Gunskirchen Lager produced by the 71st Infantry of the US Army in May 1945.

071st Infantry Division, U.S.
Infantry Division, U.S. 071st
Infantry divisions of the United States Army in World War II
Military units and formations established in 1943
Military units and formations disestablished in 1956